Gao Jian (born August 10, 1982) is a Chinese association football player.

Club career
Gao started his football career for Changchun Yatai in the 2001 league season after graduating from their youth team. He would eventually establish himself as a regular within the team and would particularly rise to prominence during the 2005 league season when he aided the team to a runners-up position within the division, leading to promotion to the top tier. The following season saw Changchun Yatai thrive in the top tier, however Gao struggled in attack and only scored four goals in 22 appearances. After his disappointing season Changchun Yatai brought in Guillaume Dah Zadi at the beginning of the 2007 league season, leading to Gao's playing time to severely drop and having to watch as the team won the league title. To get some more playing time he was loaned out to Shenzhen Shangqingyin in 2008 season for 300,000 RMB.

Honours
Changchun Yatai
Chinese Super League: 2007
Chinese Jia B League: 2003

References

External links
Profile at sodasoccer.com

1982 births
Living people
Footballers from Shenyang
Chinese footballers
Changchun Yatai F.C. players
Shenzhen F.C. players
Chinese Super League players
China League One players
Association football forwards